Emamzadeh Ali (also Romanized as Emāmzādeh ‘Alī; also known as Deh-e Shāhzādeh ‘Alī) is a village in Deyhuk Rural District, Deyhuk District, Tabas County, South Khorasan Province, Iran. At the 2006 census, its population was 69, in 20 families.

References 

Populated places in Tabas County